is a Japanese film and television actress.

Filmography

Film
 Kaerazaru hibi (1978)
 Toki o Kakeru Shōjo (1983) - Tachibana
 Lonely Heart (1985) - Makoto's mother
 The Sea and Poison (1986) - Ueda
 Sada (1998) - Yoshi Kikumoto
 Audition (1999) - Rie 
 Monday (2000) - Miyoko Kondō
 Inochi (2002) - Dr. Sugihara
 Get Up! (2003) - Kazuko Satō
 Heaven's Bookstore (2004) - Ōta
 Fine, Totally Fine (2008)
 Love Vibes (2010) - Keiko Sakata
 When Marnie Was There (2014) - Setsu Ōiwa (voice)
 Her Granddaughter (2014) - Kyoko
 100 Yen Love (2014) - Toshiko Ikeuchi
 The Third Murder (2017)
 The Lowlife (2017)
 Enokida Trading Post (2018)
 The Promised Land (2019)
 Shadowfall (2019)
 Family of Strangers (2019)
 Rise of the Machine Girls (2019)
 His (2020) - Fusae Yoshimura
 Labyrinth of Cinema (2020)
 Midnight Swan (2020)
 The Mukoda Barber Shop (2022) - Akemi Ōguro
 No Place to Go (2022) - homeless
 Break in the Clouds (2022)
 Call Me Chihiro (2023) - Nagai
 Sweet My Home (2023)

Television
 Seibu Keisatsu (1980) - Kyōko Nagai
 G-Men '75 (1981) - Tamiko Kishimoto
 Ōoka Echizen (1998) - Osen
 Kumo no Kaidan (2005) - Chikako Aaikawa
 The Queen's Classroom (2005) - Sayuri Saigō
 The Reason I Can't Find My Love (2011) - Yumiko Ogura
 Doctor Ume (2012) - Masako Katō
 Idaten (2019) - Ura Tabata

References

External links
 根岸季衣ROOM (Negishi Toshie Room)
 
 JMDb profile

1954 births
Living people
Actresses from Tokyo
Japanese film actresses
Japanese television actresses
20th-century Japanese actresses
21st-century Japanese actresses